Jerald Ezra Collins (born  February 1, 1947) is a former professional American football linebacker who played for the Buffalo Bills in 1969 to 1971 in the American Football League and National Football League.

External links
Pro-Football-Reference

1947 births
Buffalo Bills players
Living people
American football linebackers
Western Michigan Broncos football players
Players of American football from Michigan